This is a list of women's college soccer programs in the United States that play in NCAA Division I.  As of the 2022 NCAA Division I women's soccer season, 350 schools in the United States sponsor Division I varsity women's soccer; all are full Division I members except Colorado College, a Division III member which competes in Division I only for women's soccer and men's ice hockey, five schools that are transitioning from Division II, and the University of St. Thomas, transitioning from Division III. This list reflects each team's conference affiliation as of the coming 2023 NCAA women's soccer season.

Current Division I schools

See also 
 College soccer
 List of NCAA Division I men's soccer programs
 List of soccer clubs in the United States

References 

United States
Soccer clubs
NCAA Division I soccer